This article refers to sports broadcasting contracts in Japan. For a list of rights in other countries, see Sports television broadcast contracts.

Multi-sport events
IAAF World Championships in Athletics
TBS
Summer Olympic Games
Winter Olympic Games
Asian Games
Japan Consortium
World Swimming Championships
TV Asahi

American football
National Football League
DAZN

Baseball
Nippon Professional Baseball
Fuji TV
DAZN (except Yomiuri Giants home games)
NHK
Major League Baseball
NHK
J Sports
DAZN

Basketball
FIBA: DAZN
World Cup (selected games also available on Fuji TV in 2019)
TV Asahi
Nippon TV
Intercontinental Cup
National Basketball Association
Rakuten NBA Special
Wowow
NCAA Men's Division I Basketball Championship
J Sports
All Japan Intercollegiate Basketball Championship
J Sports

Boxing
Akira Yaegashi fights (Ohashi Promotions) have been aired live on TV Tokyo, TBS,　NTV, and Fuji TV. The Katsunari Takayama fight in his third tenure was aired on TBS. Others are:
NTV: Shinsuke Yamanaka and Takashi Miura (Teiken Promotions)
TBS: Kameda Promotions, Kazuto Ioka and Ryō Miyazaki (Ioka Promotions)
Fuji TV: Naoya Inoue (Ohashi Promotions), Ryōta Murata (Teiken Promotions)
TV Tokyo: Takashi Uchiyama and Kōhei Kōno (Hitoshi Watanabe's Watanabe Promotions)
WOWOW: Premier Boxing Champions, Top Rank, Matchroom Boxing, etc.
DAZN: Golden Boy, Matchroom Boxing and Dream Boxing

Darts 

 PDC events
 DAZN

Football
FIFA:
FIFA World Cup
Japan Consortium
Abema
Tokyo MX (2026 qualifiers)
FIFA Club World Cup
NHK
Abema
FIFA Women's World Cup
NHK
Abema
J Sports
TV Asahi
Tokyo MX
Boys and Girls Youth World Cups (Under-17 and Under-20)
J Sports
Abema
AFC:
AFC Asian Cup
TV Asahi
Abema
NHK
Tokyo MX
AFC Champions League
TV Asahi
Tokyo MX
Abema
NHK
AFC Cup
TV Asahi
Tokyo MX
Abema
NHK
AFF
AFF Championship
Abema
EAFF
EAFF E-1 Football Championship
Fuji TV
EAFF E-1 Football Championship (women)
Fuji TV
AFF–EAFF
AFF–EAFF Champions Trophy
Fuji TV
CONMEBOL:
Copa America
Abema
Tokyo MX
TV Asahi
UEFA:
UEFA European Football Championship
TBS
BS11
WOWOW (2024 qualifiers)
2022–23 UEFA Nations League
WOWOW
UEFA European Under-21 Championship
WOWOW
UEFA Women's Championship
WOWOW
Boys and Girls Youth Championships (Under-17 and Under-19)
WOWOW
UEFA Champions League
DAZN
Tokyo MX
TV Asahi
UEFA Europa League
DAZN
Tokyo MX
TV Asahi
UEFA Europa Conference League
DAZN
Fuji TV
UEFA Super Cup
DAZN
Tokyo MX
TV Asahi
UEFA Youth League
DAZN
TV Asahi
Abema
UEFA Women's Champions League
DAZN
Tokyo MX
J. League
Leagues (J1, J2, and J3)
NHK
DAZN
League cup
SKY PerfecTV!
NHK
Emperor's Cup
NHK
SKY PerfecTV!
Premier League
TV Asahi
J Sports
DAZN
NHK
Abema
SPOTV
Tokyo MX
English Football League (include EFL Cup)
DAZN
TV Asahi (EFL Cup only)
J Sports (EFL Championship only) 
NHK
 FA Cup
 DAZN
 J Sports
 TV Asahi
 NHK
La Liga
WOWOW
DAZN
Copa del Rey
DAZN
Serie A
SKY PerfecTV!
DAZN
Tokyo MX
 Coppa Italia
 DAZN
 Tokyo MX
 Supercoppa Italiana
 DAZN
 Tokyo MX
Ligue 1
DAZN
NHK
Coupe de France
DAZN
NHK
Trophée des Champions
DAZN
NHK
Superliga Argentina
DAZN
NHK
Campeonato Brasileiro Série A
TV Tokyo
Rede Globo/IPCTV
PFC internacional
DAZN
Canadian Championship
DAZN
A-League Men
NHK
ABC Australia
A-League Women
ABC Australia
NHK

Golf
The Masters
TBS
U.S. Open/Open Championship
TV Asahi
Golf Network
PGA Tour
NHK
Golf Network

Horse-racing
Japan Cup
TV Tokyo (Saturday)
Fuji Television (Sunday)
NHK (both General TV and BS-hi; select Sundays)
Melbourne Cup
ABC Australia

Ice hockey
All Japan Ice hockey Championship
NHK
Asia League Ice Hockey
J Sports
DAZN
National Hockey League
J Sports

Judo
World Championships
Fuji TV

Kickboxing 
 Glory
 U-NEXT
 King of Kings
 DAZN

Mixed martial arts 
 UFC
 DAZN
 Bellator MMA
 DAZN
 Bushido MMA
 DAZN

Motor racing
Formula One
Fuji TV
DAZN
Macau Grand Prix
Fuji TV
Formula E
J Sports
World Touring Car Cup
TV Osaka
IndyCar Series
Gaora
MotoGP
Nippon Television
NASCAR Cup Series
Nippon Television
World Rally Championship / FIA World Endurance Championship / Superbike World Championship / Dakar Rally / DTM / Inter Proto Series
J Sports
SUPER GT
J Sports
TV Tokyo
Super Formula
J Sports
Fuji TV
Asian Le Mans Series
J Sports
All Japan Road Race Championship / All Japan Motocross Championship / Suzuka 8 Hours

Sumo
 Grand Sumo
NHK
AbemaTV

Rugby union
Rugby World Cup
Nippon TV
NHK
J Sports
DAZN
World Rugby Sevens Series
DAZN
Super Rugby
WOWOW
Top League
J Sports
DAZN
 Six Nations
 WOWOW
 TV5Monde (France matches only)
 European Professional Club Rugby (Champions and Challenge cups)
 DAZN
 English Premiership
DAZN

Tennis
Australian Open/French Open/U.S. Open
WOWOW
Wimbledon
NHK
WOWOW
Gaora
ATP World Tour
Gaora
NHK
WOWOW
DAZN (ATP 250 only)
 WTA Tour
 DAZN
Davis Cup
DAZN
 Fed Cup
 WOWOW

Volleyball
Men's World Championships/Women's World Championships/World Grand Prix
TBS
Men's World Cup/Women's World Cup/World League
Fuji TV
Grand Champions Cups
NTV
All Japan Intercollegiate Volleyball Championship
J Sports

Wrestling
NJPW
TV Asahi
AbemaTV
J Sports
AJPW
Gaora
Noah
AbemaTV
Dragon Gate
Gaora
MBS TV
World Wonder Ring Stardom
Tokyo MX
Nippon Television

Other
 Australian Football League
ABC Australia
WatchAFL
 AFL Women's
ABC Australia
WatchAFL

References 

Japan
Contracts